Jean Blanzat (6 January 1906, Domps, Haute-Vienne – 6 November 1977, age 71) was a French novelist and a member of the French Resistance.

Biography 
After a literary debut noticed in the magazine Europe in 1929 in which he published his first story in 1930, Enfance, Jean Blanzat published his first novel, À moi-même ennemi at éditions Grasset.

During the Occupation, he continued his novelistic activity and received in June 1942 the Grand prix du roman de l'Académie française for L'Orage du matin thanks to the active and committed support of Georges Duhamel, newly elected perpetual secretary, and his friend François Mauriac who by this choice challenged the power in place.

At the Liberation of France, Jean Blanzat became editor-in-chief of Éditions Grasset (1945–1953). He was then a member of the Reading Committee at Éditions Gallimard and wrote a literary column at Le Figaro (1946–1960). In 1964, he obtained the Prix Femina for his novel .

Work 
1930: Enfance,
1936: Septembre, éditions Grasset
À moi-même ennemi, éditions Grasset
1942: L'Orage du matin
1957: La Gartempe, éditions Gallimard
1964: Le Faussaire
1966: L'Iguane

Bibliography 
 Laurent Bourdelas, Du Pays et de l'exil Un abécédaire de la littérature du Limousin, Les Ardents Editeurs, 2008. Christine Lagarde-Escoffier, Le romancier Jean Blanzat: de l'héritage à l'hérésie. 
 Collectif: Pour saluer Jean Blanzat'', Presses Univ. Limoges, 2007.

References

External links 
 Jean Blanzat on Babelio
 Jean Blanzat on IMEC archives
 Jean Blanzat pendant la Seconde Guerre Mondiale in "Pour saluer Jean Blanzat"
 Jean Blanzat à Jean Paulhan - Correspondance (1936–1958)

20th-century French novelists
20th-century French male writers
Prix Femina winners
Grand Prix du roman de l'Académie française winners
French Resistance members
1906 births
People from Haute-Vienne
1977 deaths